Namur railway station, officially Namur, is the main railway station serving Namur, Belgium. The station is used by 18,600 people every day, making it the eighth-busiest station in Belgium and the busiest in Wallonia. It is operated by the National Railway Company of Belgium (SNCB/NMBS).

History

The first railway connection to Namur was inaugurated in 1843, when the Belgian State Railways (Chemins de fer de l'État Belge) opened an indirect line from Brussels to Charleroi (via Braine-le-Comte), continuing to Namur. In 1850, the  inaugurated line 125, connecting Namur to Liège. In 1856, a third company reached Namur with a direct link to Brussels with line 161. Two years later, the company opened line 162 Namur–Arlon–Luxembourg. In 1862, the  created line 154 Namur–Dinant. The current station building was inaugurated in 1864. In 1869, the Belgian State Railways put into service a sixth line (142) connecting Namur to Tienen; it was completely closed in 1988.

At the end of the 1990s, the passenger building was restored and enlarged by a slab covering the tracks. The station was served by a daily Thalys high-speed rail service to Paris between 1998 and 31 March 2015. With the commissioning of the Schuman-Josaphat tunnel in Brussels on 3 April 2016, Namur obtained a direct link with Brussels Airport.

Train services
The station is served by the following services:

Intercity services (IC-16) Brussels – Namur – Arlon – Luxembourg
Intercity services (IC-17) Brussels Airport – Brussels-Luxembourg – Namur – Dinant (weekdays)
Intercity services (IC-17) Brussels – Namur – Dinant (weekends)
Intercity services (IC-18) Brussels – Namur – Liege (weekdays)
Intercity services (IC-19) Lille – Tournai – Saint-Ghislain – Mons – Charleroi – Namur
Intercity services (IC-25) Mons – Charleroi – Namur – Huy – Liege (weekdays)
Intercity services (IC-25) Mouscron – Tournai – Saint-Ghislain – Mons – Charleroi – Namur – Huy – Liege – Liers (weekends)
Intercity services (K82) Maubeuge – Charleroi – Namur
Local services (L-01) Namur – Huy – Liège
Local services (L-08) Ottignies – Gembloux – Namur
Local services (L-11) Namur – Dinant – Bertrix – Libramont
Local services (L-14) Ottignies – Fleurus – Charleroi – Tamines – Namur – Jambes
Local services (L-16) Namur – Assesse (- Ciney)

In addition to the above services, additional peak time trains are scheduled on weekdays (mornings and end of afternoons).

See also
 List of railway stations in Belgium

References

External links
 
  Namur Station on SNCB website

Railway stations in Belgium
1843 establishments in Belgium
Railway stations in Namur (province)
Buildings and structures in Namur (city)
Railway stations in Belgium opened in 1843